Laurent Gaudé (born demain, 6 July 1972) is a French writer.

He studied theater and has written many dramatic works, among them Onysos le furieux, Cendres sur les mains, Médée Kali, and Le Tigre bleu de l'Euphrate.

Life
Gaudé was born in Paris. After a master's in humanities at the Université Paris III, for which he presented a dissertation entitled Le thème du combat dans la dramaturgie comptemporaine française (The theme of combat in the French contemporary dramaturgy), supervised by Michel Corvin (1994), then a post-graduate diploma at the same university, for which he presented a dissertation entitled Le conflit dans le théâtre contemporain (The conflict in contemporary theater), supervised by Jean-Pierre Sarrazac (1998), he wrote plays (1999).

His first play, Combat de possédés, was published in 1999. It has been performed in Germany and has been read at the Royal National Theatre in London. The second play, published in 2000, is Onysos le Furieux. It is an epic monologue, written in only 10 days during the spring of 1996. Laurent Gaudé has also written other plays such as Pluie de Cendres, Cendres sur les mains, Médée Kali or Le Tigre bleu de l'Euphrate.

In 2002, his second novel, La Mort du roi Tsongor, allowed him to be cited for the Prix Goncourt and above all to be rewarded by the Prix Goncourt des lycéens and the Prix des librairies. Two years later, he won the Prix Goncourt as well as the Prix Jean Giono with his novel Le Soleil des Scorta (The Scortas' Sun) which has been a best-seller  (80 000 copies sold between the novel publication and the awarding in 2004).

Awards
In 2002 he won the Prix Goncourt des lycéens and in 2003 the Prix des Libraires for La Mort du roi Tsongor. Two years later, he won the Prix Goncourt and the Prix Jean Giono for his novel The Scortas' Sun (French: Le Soleil des Scorta). In 2019, his book Nous l’Europe, banquet des peuples, won the European Book Prize and Salina, les trois exils won the Grand prix du roman métis.

Novels 
Cris: roman, Actes Sud, 2001, 
Battle of will, Translators David Greig, Oberon, 2002, 
La mort du roi Tsongor: roman, Actes sud, 2002, ; Actes Sud, 2005, 
Death of an ancient king, Harper Perennial, 2002, 
The death of King Tsongor, Toby Press, 2003, 
Death of an Ancient King, Translator Adriana Hunter, MacAdam/Cage, 2007, 
Le soleil des Scorta: roman, Actes sud, 2004, 
The Scortas' sun, Hesperus, 2006, 
Le Tigre bleu de l'Euphrate, Actes Sud, 2002, 
Eldorado, Actes Sud, 2006, 
Eldorado, Translator Adriana Hunter, MacAdam Cage, 2008, 
La porte des enfers: roman, Actes Sud, 2008, 
Sodome, ma douce, Actes Sud, 2009, 
Dans la nuit Mozambique et autres récits, Actes Sud, 2007,

References

External links
Official Laurent Gaude web site
"Rencontre avec Laurent Gaudé", parutions, Thomas Regnier
Laurent Gaude – “Le Soleil des Scorta" in Georgian blog
"The House of Scorta", mostly fiction, Jana L. Perskie, 22 March 2006

1972 births
Living people
Writers from Paris
20th-century French novelists
21st-century French novelists
20th-century French dramatists and playwrights
21st-century French dramatists and playwrights
Prix Goncourt winners
Prix des libraires winners
Prix Goncourt des lycéens winners
French people of Italian descent